Platanthera stricta is a species of orchid known by the common name slender bog orchid. It is native to western North America from Alaska and Yukon south to Utah and northern California.

Platanthera stricta grows in wet areas, such as shady forest meadows. The inflorescence has widely spaced green flowers, sometimes tinged red or purple.

References

External links

 Jepson Manual Treatment
 Photo gallery

stricta
Orchids of Canada
Orchids of the United States
Flora of Alaska
Plants described in 1835
Flora without expected TNC conservation status